AFDX-384 (BIBN-161) is a drug which acts as a selective antagonist of the muscarinic acetylcholine receptors, with selectivity for the M2 and M4 subtypes. It is used mainly for mapping the distribution of M2 and M4 muscarinic receptors in the brain, and studying their involvement in the development and treatment of dementia and schizophrenia.

See also
 Pirenzepine (M1 selective antagonist)

References 

Muscarinic antagonists
Piperidines
Ureas
Benzodiazepines
Pyridodiazepines